Proteolipid protein 2 is a protein that in humans is encoded by the PLP2 gene.

References

Further reading